Diocese of Albany may refer to:

Episcopal Diocese of Albany, New York, United States
Roman Catholic Diocese of Albany, New York, United States

See also
Diocese of Albano, a suburbicarian see of the Roman Catholic Church in Italy
Warwick Bastian, assistant bishop in the Anglican Diocese of Bunbury, Australia, (1968-1979) with the title Bishop of Albany